Guotie could refer to:

 Guotie (Chinese: 锅贴, pinyin: guōtiē), a northern Chinese style dumpling
 China Railway (Chinese: 国铁, pinyin: guótiě)